The Cherokee Kid is a 1996 American made for television western film directed by Paris Barclay for HBO. The film's stars were Sinbad, James Coburn, Burt Reynolds, Gregory Hines, A Martinez, Ernie Hudson, Dawnn Lewis and Vanessa Bell Calloway.

Plot

The Cherokee Kid, a notorious gunslinger, faces off in a showdown against The Undertaker in Larabee, Texas.  A few unheard words are exchanged and they take their places.  They both draw and the Cherokee Kid falls, much to the delight of land-grabber Bloomington.  Bloomington is more than willing to give the Undertaker more than the stipulated reward, yet the Undertaker insists on allowing the Cherokee Kid to receive a proper eulogy, which will be done the next day at noon.

Several people attend the funeral, including Reverend Peel and his wife, who adopted and raised him, Nat Love and his gang, and several others.  It is then that Juan Nepomuceno Cortina begins the eulogy.

The Cherokee Kid was born Isaiah Turner, he and his family lived in the Oklahoma territory.  Many families in the area were being forced to sell their property for next to nothing so that the railroad could be built.  When Isaiah's half-Cherokee father opposed them, he was murdered.  Isaiah then followed his older brother Jedediah into the camp where the railroad men were and shot the man responsible for their father's death.  When they returned home and told their mother what they did, she instantly scolded them, telling them not to mistake stupidity for courage.  Their mother knew that the railroad men would come for Jedediah, and in a moment of final family bonding, she gave to the boys their father's favorite hat adorned with a distinct Cherokee feather.  It was Isaiah who claimed the hat as he was placed in a woodbox while a plan to allow Jedediah to escape was put in motion in which their mother pretended to shoot him at a distance.  Their mother held off the men as best as she could, until a younger Bloomington came in from the back door and shot her twice, though not before grazing his forehead with a bullet and leaving a scar.  His assistant Bonner was tasked with finding Jedediah (which he never does), and fires in the air claiming he did so.

Isaiah then ran aimlessly not knowing where to go, until he wandered into the home of Reverend Peel and his wife, who decided to adopt him as they had no children.  Fourteen years later, he grew into a tall, strong, yet clumsy and naïve young man who still clung to his desire for revenge.  One day Isaiah saw a poster advertising Bloomington's arrival at Pinedale, where he would speak to the people as he was now running for governor.  Isaiah decided to go and take revenge for the death of his family.  After saying goodbye to his foster parents, and being told which way Pinedale was (Isaiah's lack of a sense of direction a running joke throughout), he sets out.  Hiding out in a cabin, Isaiah gets into a comical scuffle with a man named Jake Carver in which he ends up using a turkey to accidentally kill him and inadvertently saves a prostitute from being raped.  She then cooks the turkey for him out of gratitude, yet disappears the next day with all the leftovers.  That day he is found by Jake Carver's gang, and after unsuccessfully passing himself off as him he then passes himself off as a childhood friend of his and claims that he had planned for them to rob a bank in Pinedale (thus tricking them into taking him there).  

Arriving at Pinedale, Isaiah walks into a bank.  After making small talk with one of the tellers in which he is told of the gifts given to clients depending on how much is deposited, he then loudly announces that the gang is there to ro the bank.  The tellers instantly draw guns on them, with the teller explaining to Isaiah that the gun is the last gift given for the highest amount deposited.  After coming across Bonner, and comically shooting him in the buttocks, Isaiah runs off into the crowd gathered to hear Bloomington and disrupts the speech after bringing up the night in which he killed his mother and was scarred.  Trying unsuccessfully to shoot him, Isaiah runs off and hides in the wagon of Otter Bob (Burt Reynolds), a lonely man of the mountains.  That night, a friendship began when Isaiah reveals that he knows how to read, and Isaiah at first barters transportation to El Paso for teaching Otter Bob to read, but then also adds that Otter Bob also teach him how to be a mountain man.

For 3 months they traveled together, and Isaiah eventually learned all of Otter Bob's tricks and methods.  Bonner and his men were on Isaiah's trail, and eventually caught up to Otter Bob, who ended up sacrificing himself to save Isaiah's life.  Isaiah escaped with a fatally wounded Otter Bob, leaving Bonner caught in a bear trap.  Isaiah then holds Otter Bob as he gives his last words, then buries him before continuing alone.  Along the way, he comes across Cortina who is buried up to his neck in the sand and saves him.  That night, Cortina vows to follow Isaiah (who introduces himself as Bob) until he can repay his debt by saving Isaiah's life.  Reaching El Paso, Isaiah and Cortina stop at a saloon where Cortina sits at a table to play cards and Isaiah goes to the bar for a drink.  Bonner who is already there and sees Isaiah from the upstairs balcony of the saloon, sets a trap for him and pays a prostitute to distract him while he and several men surround and arrest him.  Isaiah is led out as Cortina watches from a distance.

In jail, Isaiah is placed in the same cell as Nat Love, a famous gunslinger, and leader of a gang.  Isaiah quickly expresses his awe and admiration, saying he would love to receive whatever tutelage he could from him.  Nat simply tells him to enjoy the day as Nat is scheduled to be hung the next day.  Bloomington arrives to gloat at Isaiah's capture, and Isaiah vows to come back from the grave for revenge if need be.  When Isaiah mentions Jedediah's name, Nat instantly tells Isaiah that he was alive, grew up to be a good man and a gunslinger in his own right, but lost a duel to the Undertaker.  Isaiah then vows to also kill the Undertaker as well.  That night, Cortina arrives and breaks Isaiah out of jail, with Nat also escaping.  When they're about to part ways, Isaiah shoots a man that had shot and missed Cortina, thus saving his life once more.  Nat steals Isaiah's horse, with Isaiah having to ride with Cortina yet constantly falling off his horse as they followed Nat back to his hideout where he's met with open arms by his gang.  Isaiah then manages to convince Nat to allow them to stay for a few days, and shortly after meets the rest of his gang:  Stagecoach Mary, and a group of nuns who also serve as accomplices.  During their time there, Isaiah is constantly mocked and disrespected by Nat's gang as he comically and dangerously tries to practice gunslinging.  Nat Love takes matters into his own hands and forces Isaiah to shoot a can off his hand at gunpoint, telling Isaiah that he would kill him if he hit him.  Isaiah then makes his first successful shot and is told by Nat to plan on dying whenever he shoots as someone.  Isaiah then learns to ride a horse after Nat compares riding a horse to being with a woman, and Stagecoach Mary takes his virginity to give him a basis after some mockery from the men.  Isaiah continues to work on his skills and excels quickly, much to Nat's wonder and admiration.  One night Nat calls for a meeting in which he declares that Isaiah needs a gunslinger name.  After some mockery from some of the gang members, Nat asks Isaiah what it is that he's proud of, as a man must have a name that he can be proud of.  Isaiah instantly names his half-Cherokee father, who died fighting for his convictions.  It is then that he is given the name "The Cherokee Kid".

The next day after a change in wardrobe, the Cherokee Kid and Cortina follow Nat and his gang as they go to rob a bank, this being Isaiah's final lesson.  During the robbery, Nat tells Isaiah to pay attention to how it's done, and Isaiah learns quickly as he shoots his way out flawlessly during the getaway.  Nat returns to his hideout as Isaiah and Cortina part ways with them, with the promise that they would meet again in the future.  The Cherokee Kid then sets out to rob Bloomington's banks in an effort to become his leading priority, and to humiliate him.  Bloomington desperately calls for as many mercenaries and bounty hunters as he can find, including the Undertaker.  Bloomington offers a bag of gold coins to whoever can kill the Cherokee Kid, and the Undertaker quickly announces that the Cherokee Kid is his, disabling one of the men who challenges him.

Arriving in Larabee, Isaiah and Cortina are graciously welcomed by the Holsopple family as they arrive at their farm looking to buy fresh horses.  They are asked to stay for dinner, much to the chagrin and disgrace of Abby, the farmer's daughter.  During dinner, Abby knocks out Isaiah and Cortina with a frying pan, with the intention of turning them in and collecting the reward money to use to keep their land.  Abby remains untrusting of the Cherokee Kid, naively believing that they're there to rob them.  After escaping their restraints, Isaiah and Cortina tell Abby they'll come back, and after Isaiah remarks that Abby may like him, she gets her rifle and shoots at them in anger, missing all four shots and claiming that it's too dark to see.

The next day, a gunslinger unsuccessfully attempts to kill the Cherokee Kid after telling him that the Undertaker is looking for him.  The Cherokee Kid then tells the gunslinger to tell the Undertaker that he wants to meet him the next day on the main street.  Later that day Isaiah goes to see Abby once more, and after some banter, her attraction to him becomes slightly apparent.  It is here that Cortina ends his eulogy as Bonner enters with some men demanding that the Cherokee Kid be put underground per Bloomington's orders.  Everyone at the funeral keeps them at bay, claiming they will carry the casket themselves, to which Bonner relents.

Outside, the Undertaker gives his recount of the duel.  It is through this recount that it is revealed that the Undertaker is in fact, Jedediah Turner, Isaiah's brother.  The Undertaker recognizing The Cherokee Kid as Isaiah due to their father's Cherokee feather on his hat, and The Cherokee Kid recognizing The Undertaker as Jedediah due to his quoting of their mother.  The duel takes place, and Isaiah falls.  The Undertaker then opens the casket to reveal a still alive Isaiah who then opens fire on Bloomington, and thus keeping his promise to "come back from the grave".  A major gunfight erupts with the Cherokee Kid, Cortina, Undertaker, Abby, Nat Love and his gang against Bloomington's men as Bloomington looks for a way to escape.  In the gunfight Nat is killed, and Cortina is wounded.  Isaiah and Jedediah re-affirm their brotherhood, claiming that to be the best day of their lives regardless of the outcome before taking out what's left of Bloomington's men together.  In the aftermath, Isaiah then looks for Bloomington, cornering him in a barn.  Bloomington goes as far as to offer him a partnership in an effort to save himself.  Isaiah, disgusted, turns his back to him.  Bloomington then tries to shoot him but is quickly shot by Isaiah who then stands over a wounded Bloomington and executes him in the same way his mother was killed.  Isaiah turns around to see Bonner aiming at him, but is shot from behind by Jedediah.

Nat Love is buried and his gang (now fully respecting Isaiah) part ways.  Isaiah and Jedediah engage in some banter as they plan to go west to get to know each other better and right more wrongs, to Abby's disapproval.  Abby claims that since he has already reached all his goals being the Cherokee Kid is no longer necessary, but Isaiah claims he likes being a gunslinger.  Cortina attempts to go his own way, but Isaiah reminds him that he has once again saved his life and Cortina somewhat reluctantly agrees to stay.  As they turn to leave, they're shot at by Abby, who insists on going with them, and they ride off.

Cast

References

External links

1996 films
1996 television films
1990s Western (genre) comedy films
HBO Films films
Films scored by Stanley Clarke
Films directed by Paris Barclay
Films set in Texas
1996 comedy films